Niigata City Higashi General Sports Center is an arena in Niigata, Niigata, Japan. It is the former home arena of the Niigata Albirex BB of the B.League, Japan's professional basketball league.

Facilities
Main arena - 1,826.82sqm
Sub arena - 816.09sqm
Training room
Climbing room

References

External links
Niigata East General Sports Centre

Basketball venues in Japan
Indoor arenas in Japan
Niigata Albirex BB
Sports venues in Niigata Prefecture
Buildings and structures in Niigata (city)
Sports venues completed in 1998
1998 establishments in Japan